KQZZ (96.7 FM, "Mix 96.7 FM") is an American commercial radio station licensed to serve Crary, North Dakota.  The station is owned by i3G Media, Inc. KQZZ is operated along with its three sister stations under the collective name Lake Region Radio Works.  It airs a Hot Adult Contemporary music format.

KQZZ previously ran a longtime classic rock format known as "Q97" and later as "96.7 The Rock". "The Rock" evolved to a mainstream rock (a classic-based rock format incorporating some current rock to its playlist) in its later years. KQZZ flipped from its longtime rock format to hot adult contemporary as "Mix 96.7 FM" in April 2011.

The station was assigned the KQZZ call letters by the Federal Communications Commission on March 29, 1996.

References

External links

QZZ
Radio stations established in 1996
Hot adult contemporary radio stations in the United States
Ramsey County, North Dakota
1996 establishments in North Dakota